Olaf I may refer to:

Olof (I) of Sweden (ruled c. 854)
Amlaíb Conung of Dublin (died c. 875)
Olaf I of Norway (Olav Tryggvason), king of Norway (995–1000)
Olaf I of Denmark (Oluf Hunger), king of Denmark (1086–1095)
Óláfr Guðrøðarson (died 1153), King of the Isles (1112/1115–1153)